The men's coxless fours event was part of the rowing programme at the 1924 Summer Olympics. The competition, the third appearance of the event, was held from 14 to 17 July 1924 on the river Seine. Four teams, each from a different nation, competed.

Results

Semifinals

The top two boats in each semifinal advanced to the final, meaning no teams were eliminated.

Final

References

Sources
 
 

Four, coxless